Giovanni Maria Luffoli (1632-1690) was an Italian painter of the Baroque period active in Pesaro. He was a pupil of Simone Cantarini, and mainly active in Pesaro from 1665 to 1707.

References

1632 births
1690 deaths
17th-century Italian painters
Italian male painters
Italian Baroque painters